Kevin Dean Schamehorn (July 28, 1956 – December 8, 2022) was a Canadian professional ice hockey right winger. He played in 10 National Hockey League games with the Detroit Red Wings and the Los Angeles Kings between 1976 and 1980. The rest of his career, which lasted from 1976 to 1990, was spent in various minor leagues. As a youth, he played in the 1968 and 1969 Quebec International Pee-Wee Hockey Tournaments with a minor ice hockey team from Borden.

Schamehorn died on December 8, 2022, at the age of 66.

Career statistics

Regular season and playoffs

References

External links
 

1956 births
2022 deaths
Adirondack Red Wings players
Bellingham Blazers players
Canadian ice hockey right wingers
Detroit Red Wings draft picks
Detroit Red Wings players
Flint Spirits players
Houston Aeros draft picks
Houston Apollos players
Ice hockey people from British Columbia
Kalamazoo Wings (1974–2000) players
Kansas City Red Wings players
Los Angeles Kings players
Milwaukee Admirals (IHL) players
New Westminster Bruins players
Rochester Americans players
Sportspeople from Victoria, British Columbia